Thelma Connell (credited early in her career as Thelma Myers) was a film editor from England. She was known for her work on thrillers and mysteries, and she often collaborated with Frank Launder, Sidney Lumet, and Lewis Gilbert.

Biography 
Born in London, she began her career as a continuity girl, and then moved to assistant editor on films such as The Life and Death of Colonel Blimp before taking the editing role for the first time in In Which We Serve (1943).

Subsequent films included Green for Danger (1946), The Deadly Affair (1966)  and Alfie (1966) for which she was nominated for a BAFTA. She was the original editor on the 1967 James Bond film You Only Live Twice, but she was replaced after the producers were unhappy with the running time of the film.

On television, she acted as producer on the ITC series The Adventures of Robin Hood. She also served as co-director on the 1954 film Tale of Three Women.

Selected filmography 

 Operation: Daybreak (1976)
 Paul and Michelle (1974)
 Maria Marusjka (1973)
 The Call of the Wild (1972)
 Endless Night (1972)
 See No Evil (1971)
 The Buttercup Chain (1970)
 The Virgin Soldiers (1969)
 The Appointment (1969)
 The Deadly Affair (1967)
 Island of Terror (1966)
 Alfie (1966)
 Dr. Terror's House of Horrors (1965)
 Shadow of Treason (1964)
 Hide and Seek (1964)
 The Barber of Stamford Hill (1962)
 Only Two Can Play (1962)
 The Night We Got the Bird (1961)
 Wee Geordie (1955)
 Tale of Three Women (1954)
 Star of My Night (1954)
 Folly to Be Wise (1952)
 Stranger on the Prowl (1952)
 Bikini Baby (1951)
 The Mudlark (1950)
 The Great Manhunt (1950)
 The Blue Lagoon (1949)
 Green for Danger (1946)
 I See a Dark Stranger (1946)
 Notorious Gentleman (1945)
 In Which We Serve (1942)

References

External links

1912 births
1976 deaths
Film people from London
English film editors
British women film editors